Nant Whitton Woodlands is a Site of Special Scientific Interest in Vale of Glamorgan, south Wales. The site is a narrow strip of woodland on a Liassic limestone slope in the Vale of Glamorgan.

See also
List of Sites of Special Scientific Interest in Mid & South Glamorgan

Sites of Special Scientific Interest in Mid & South Glamorgan
Geography of the Vale of Glamorgan